Compulsion may refer to:

 Compulsive behavior, a psychological condition in which a person does a behavior compulsively, having an overwhelming feeling that they must do so.
 Obsessive–compulsive disorder, a mental disorder characterized by intrusive thoughts that produce anxiety and by repetitive behaviors aimed at reducing that anxiety.

Art and entertainment 
 Compulsion (Hutson novel), a 2002 horror novel by Shaun Hutson
 Compulsion (Kellerman novel), an Alex Delaware novel by Jonathan Kellerman
 Compulsion (Levin novel), a 1956 novel by Meyer Levin and a 1957 adapted play by Levin
 Compulsion (1959 film), a 1959 film based on Levin's novel
 Compulsion (2009 film), a 2009 United Kingdom television drama, inspired by the Jacobean tragedy The Changeling
 Compulsion, a play by Rinne Groff, which premiered at Berkeley Rep in 2010, about Meyer Levin
 Compulsion (2013 film), a 2013 film directed by Egidio Coccimiglio
 Compulsion (2016 film), a 2016 erotic thriller film directed by Craig Goodwill
 "Compulsion", an episode from season 5 of CSI: Crime Scene Investigation
 Compulsion (album), a jazz album by pianist Andrew Hill, originally released in 1966 under the Blue Note Label as BST 84217
 Compulsion (band), a punk rock group active between 1990 and 1996, originally called Thee Amazing Colossal Men until 1992
 Compulsion, a play by Rinne Groff
 "Compulsion", a song by Joe Crow, covered on Martin Gore's Counterfeit e.p.

See also